Michael Rank can refer to:

 Michael Rank (author), a British author
 Michael Rank (musician), an American musician